Elizaveta Evgenievna Solozhenkina (born 10 September 2003) is a Russian chess player. She received the FIDE title of Woman Grandmaster (WGM) in 2021.

Biography
Elizaveta Solozhenkina is the daughter of GM Evgeniy Solozhenkin.  She is a Saint Petersburg chess school schoolgirl. She started playing chess from the age of five. In 2015, Elizaveta Solozhenkina won the Russian Youth Chess Championship in the U13 girls age group.

Solozhenkina repeatedly represented Russia at the European Youth Chess Championships and World Youth Chess Championships in different age groups, where she won five medals: gold (in 2015, at the European Youth Chess Championship in the U12 girls age group), three silver (in 2012 and 2013, at the European Youth Chess Championship in the U10 girls age group, and in 2014, at the World Youth Chess Championship in the U12 girls age group) and bronze (in 2017, at the World Youth Chess Championship in the U14 girls age group).

In 2016, she was awarded the FIDE Woman International Master (WIM) title.

References

External links
 
 
 

2003 births
Living people
Russian female chess players
Chess woman grandmasters